Oscar Lewis (born c. 1952) is a former American football coach.  He was the fifth head football coach at Frostburg State University in Frostburg, Maryland, serving for final three games of the 1976 season and compiling a record of 0–3.  Lewis was named the head coach after Mike Davis had completed a record of 1–16 since the start of the 1975 season.  Lewis coached the remaining games and then stepped down.

References

1950s births
Living people
Frostburg State Bobcats football coaches